In combinatorial geometry, the Hadwiger conjecture states that any convex body in n-dimensional Euclidean space can be covered by 2n or fewer smaller bodies homothetic with the original body, and that furthermore, the upper bound of 2n is necessary if and only if the body is a parallelepiped. There also exists an equivalent formulation in terms of the number of floodlights needed to illuminate the body.

Additionally, there is a different Hadwiger conjecture concerning graph coloring—and in some sources the geometric Hadwiger conjecture is also called the Levi–Hadwiger conjecture or the Hadwiger–Levi covering problem.

Formal statement
Formally, the Hadwiger conjecture is: If K is any bounded convex set in the n-dimensional Euclidean space Rn, then there exists a set of 2n scalars si and a set of 2n translation vectors vi such that all si lie in the range 0 < si < 1, and 

 

Furthermore, the upper bound is necessary iff K is a parallelepiped, in which case all 2n of the scalars may be chosen to be equal to 1/2.

Alternate formulation with illumination
As shown by Boltyansky, the problem is equivalent to one of illumination: how many floodlights must be placed outside of an opaque convex body in order to completely illuminate its exterior? For the purposes of this problem, a body is only considered to be illuminated if for each point of the boundary of the body, there is at least one floodlight that is separated from the body by all of the tangent planes intersecting the body on this point; thus, although the faces of a cube may be lit by only two floodlights, the planes tangent to its vertices and edges cause it to need many more lights in order for it to be fully illuminated. For any convex body, the number of floodlights needed to completely illuminate it turns out to equal the number of smaller copies of the body that are needed to cover it.

Examples
As shown in the illustration, a triangle may be covered by three smaller copies of itself, and more generally in any dimension a simplex may be covered by n + 1 copies of itself, scaled by a factor of n/(n + 1). However, covering a square by smaller squares (with parallel sides to the original) requires four smaller squares, as each one can cover only one of the larger square's four corners. In higher dimensions, covering a hypercube or more generally a parallelepiped by smaller homothetic copies of the same shape requires a separate copy for each of the vertices of the original hypercube or parallelepiped; because these shapes have 2n vertices, 2n smaller copies are necessary. This number is also sufficient: a cube or parallelepiped may be covered by 2n copies, scaled by a factor of 1/2. Hadwiger's conjecture is that parallelepipeds are the worst case for this problem, and that any other convex body may be covered by fewer than 2n smaller copies of itself.

Known results
The two-dimensional case was settled by : every two-dimensional bounded convex set may be covered with four smaller copies of itself, with the fourth copy needed only in the case of parallelograms. However, the conjecture remains open in higher dimensions except for some special cases. The best known asymptotic upper bound on the number of smaller copies needed to cover a given body is

where  is a positive constant. In three dimensions it is known that 16 copies always suffice, but this is still far from the conjectured bound of 8 copies.

The conjecture is known to hold for certain special classes of convex bodies, including symmetric polyhedra and bodies of constant width in three dimensions. The number of copies needed to cover any zonotope is at most , while for bodies with a smooth surface (that is, having a single tangent plane per boundary point), at most  smaller copies are needed to cover the body, as Levi already proved.

See also
Borsuk's conjecture on covering convex bodies with sets of smaller diameter

Notes

References
.
.
.
.
.
.
.

Discrete geometry
Conjectures
Unsolved problems in geometry